Nanded railway division is one of the three railway divisions under South Central Railway zone of Indian Railways. This railway division was formed on 1 April 2003 and its headquarter is located at Nanded in the state of Maharashtra in India. Secunderabad railway division and Hyderabad railway division are the other railway divisions under SCR Zone headquartered at Secunderabad.

Routes & Jurisdiction 

Electrification of all the sections except akola-khandwa has been sanctioned and the work is under progress .
Gauge conversion is under progress between Akot and khandwa Jn(excl).

The list includes the stations under the Nanded division and their station category.

See also

 Zones and divisions of Indian Railways

References

 
Divisions of Indian Railways
2003 establishments in Maharashtra